El-Djazair is a hotel in Algiers, Algeria. The hotel contains 296 rooms and has 7 senior and 19 junior suites. It is noted for its Algerian, French and Chinese cuisine.

References

External links
 Website

Hotels in Algiers
Hotels in Algeria
Hotel buildings completed in 1889
Hotels established in 1889